Wabuda Island is the third largest island in the Fly River delta, Papua New Guinea, after Kiwai Island and Purutu Island. Its area is 109 km².

Administratively, the island belongs to Kiwai Rural LLG in South Fly District of Western Province.

See also
Waboda language

Fly River
Islands of Papua New Guinea
Western Province (Papua New Guinea)